José Luis Sánchez Castillo (born May 28, 1987, in Monterrey, Nuevo León) is a Mexican sport shooter. Sanchez represented Mexico at the 2008 Summer Olympics in Beijing, where he competed in the men's 10 m air rifle, along with his teammate Roberto José Elias. He finished only in twenty-fourth place by one point behind U.S. shooter Jason Parker from the final attempt, for a total score of 591 targets.

References

External links
NBC 2008 Olympics profile

Mexican male sport shooters
Living people
Olympic shooters of Mexico
Shooters at the 2008 Summer Olympics
Sportspeople from Monterrey
1987 births
Shooters at the 2015 Pan American Games
Pan American Games medalists in shooting
Pan American Games bronze medalists for Mexico
Shooters at the 2019 Pan American Games
Medalists at the 2019 Pan American Games
Shooters at the 2020 Summer Olympics
21st-century Mexican people